Tony Carlyon (16 April 1970) is a former professional cricketer who played for Jersey and is the current team coach.

In the final match for Jersey in the 2016 ICC World Cricket League Division Four tournament, the fifth-place playoff against Italy, he played alongside his son, Harrison Carlyon. Injuries in the Jersey team forced him to play, becoming the first father and son to play together in an international match for Jersey. He last played for Jersey in 2011.

References

External links
 

1970 births
Living people
Jersey cricketers
Place of birth missing (living people)